"Hepfidelity and More" is a video by Australian musician Diesel. It was released in 1993 

It includes video clips and live tracks from Diesel's triple platinum album Hepfidelity  and The Lobbyist.

Track listing
 "Love Junk - 0:08
 "Come to Me" - 0:10
 "Love Junk" - 3:46
 "Come to Me" (UK Version) - 1:03
 "Come To Me" - 1:42
 "Too Much of a Good Thing" (Live) - 4:44
 "Man Alive" - 4:01
 "One More Time" - 3:59
 "Come to Me" (Live)	- 4:45
 "Tip of My Tongue" - 3:56
 "Get Lucky" - 5:05
 "Never Miss Your Water" - 4:02
 "Masterplan" - 5:17
 "I've Been Loving You Too Long" - 3:54
 Also features exclusive interview footage

External links

References

Music video compilation albums
1993 video albums